Eretis buamba is a species of butterfly in the family Hesperiidae. It is found in the Democratic Republic of the Congo and western Uganda.

References

Butterflies described in 1937
Celaenorrhinini